The 2020 Team Speedway Junior World Championship was the 16th FIM Team Under-21 World Championship season. The final took place on 5 September 2020, at the Varde Moror Arena in Outrup, Denmark. The event had originally been planned for 22 August but was delayed due to concerns over the COVID-19 pandemic.

Poland won their 13th Team Under-21 World Championship, and their seventh in succession.

Final 
  Outrup
 5 September 2020

Scores

See also 
 2020 Speedway of Nations
 2020 Individual Speedway Junior World Championship

References 

2020
World Team Junior